The Psychological Primary Colors or Primary Colors In Psychology or Psychological Color Model or Color model in psychology were used by several people, almost all of them used the colors red, yellow, blue and green as the 4 Primary Colors.  To see what utility psychological primary colors are (See utility of these colors) What are the psychological primary colors? These Colors Are A Psychological Model With 4 Primary Colors.

Theories

Ewald Hering 
Psychological: red, yellow, green and blue. The origin is in the so-called theory of the color opposition process of Ewald Hering (1834-1918) which included six primary psychological colors grouped into pairs that are opposite: black and white, red and green, yellow and blue.

Quattron 
 is the brand name of an LCD color display technology produced by Sharp Electronics. In addition to the standard RGB (Red, Green, and Blue) color subpixels, the technology utilizes a yellow fourth color subpixel (RGBY) which Sharp claims increases the range of displayable colors, and which may mimic more closely the way the brain processes color information. The screen is a form of multi-primary color display, other forms of which have been developed in parallel to Sharp's version.

Max Lüscher 
Máx Lüscher also used the 4 Psychological Primary Colors and he ordered them basic and auxiliary. he used red, yellow, blue and green as basics. and used black, gray, brown, and violet as auxiliary colors.

Utilities of these 4 Psychological Primary Colors

Richard Waller 
Four primary colors yellow, red, blue and green are arranged on the sides of a square whose diagonals produce the mixtures. His square is the last "obstacle" on the way to Newton, who had been occupied with optical experiments since 1670 and based the future order of colors on a fundamentally physical way of thinking. At this point, the old view ends, according to which colors arise as modifications of white light through the addition of darkness. However, Johann Wolfgang von Goethe later revived this idea of cloudiness with all vigour.

At the time when, at the end of the 17th century, the old order of colors from light to dark or from black to white was disappearing and Isaac Newton was setting up a new system, the Englishman Richard Waller in London was trying to see if the colors could not be in could arrange in a square. He publishes his attempts at order with the intention of providing a "Standard of Colours". We represent his system with four primary colors — yellow (Yellow, Y), red (Red, R), blue (Blue, B), and green (Green, G) — that aren't at the corners, but at the center of each page . The resulting mixtures can then be drawn into the fields of the resulting network. Waller did not determine these middle tones according to his feelings, he rather proceeded according to the weight, i.e. he mixed the respective starting pigments in a weight ratio of 1:1. If Waller's square is broken down into its primary and secondary lines (bottom left and right, respectively), the diagonals reveal themselves as places of synthesis. The mixed colors — orange (Orange, O), yellow-green (Yellowgreen, YG), blue-green (Bluegreen, BG) and violet (Violet, V) — result, physically speaking, from the forces that span the pure colors.

Waller published his system around 1686 under the title "Catalogue of Simple and Mixed Colors". His square is the last obstacle on the way to Newton, who had been occupied with optical experiments since 1670 and based the future order of colors on a fundamentally physical way of thinking. At this point, the old view ends, according to which colors arise as modifications of white light through the addition of darkness. (Johann Wolfgang von Goethe will later revive this idea of cloudiness with all vigour.) The idea that colors are not modifications of white light, but rather its original components, was gained through experiments with a prism. The Bohemian physicist Marcus Marci was the first to use a glass body of this type in 1648. He allowed sunlight to fall into a dark room with a small opening and then passed the resulting beam through a prism. He saw a sequence of colors that we now call a spectrum: red, white, violet. Marci saw that the alleged modification depended on the angle at which the light was deflected, and he also noted that even then the colored light could not be further broken down.

Around the same time (1650) F. M. Grimaldi discovered in Bologna that small openings result in colored light phenomena, which we explain today by the so-called diffraction. The physics of color then really got going, before Newton, with Robert Hooke, who began studying the colors produced when light is refracted on thin sheets of mica or between sheets of glass. In his work Micrographia, Hooke also made bold assumptions about the nature of light. For him there was a ripple motion going on here, and a ripple surface perpendicular to the ray produced white, in his view. If the wave surface was tilted, the ability to color appeared, which becomes effective at the edge of a light beam. Color as the obliquity of a wave surface - only a physicist could think of that, but the representatives of their guild also had clearer ideas, and they will occupy us in a few of the following plates.

NCS System 
The aim of the Swedish color researchers was to devise a color system by which anyone with normal color vision would be able to make color determinations without having to rely on color measuring instruments or color samples. In the NCS color system, the six elementary color sensations black, white, yellow, red, blue and green are placed at the six decisive points of a double cone, namely the achromatic colors at the two ends and the four chromatic colors with equal distances in the color wheel. A three-dimensional framework is created, defined by elementary color sensations and in which each color perception finds its place according to its nuance and hue.

The system of natural colors, the «Natural Color System NCS», comes from Sweden. It operates with the six primary colors proposed by Leonardo da Vinci (text passage) and Ewald Hering's opponent theory. Concrete starting points for the research work were Tryggve Johansson's system and Sven Hesselgren's color atlas. The company started in 1964 and in the late 1960s Anders Hård and Lars Sivik were able to present their first results.

The aim of the Swedish color researchers was to devise a color system by which anyone with normal color vision would be able to make color determinations without having to rely on color measuring instruments or color samples. The NCS system should be able to be used to determine the color of a wall in a room, the color of a deciduous tree at a distance, the color of a painted surface showing simultaneous contrasts, or the color of a spot on a television screen. The sole basis should be the perception of a color and not the comparison of different colors with each other ("color matching").

The system of natural colors has the external form of a double cone, which is designed in such a way that the four psychological basic colors yellow (Y), red (R), blue (B) and green (G) form the basic circle and places with equal distances take from each other. The two vertices of the bicone are white (above) and black (below), with the connection between each of the four primary colors and the two achromatic vertices forming an equilateral triangle.

This triangle indicates the nuance of a color. The perceived white (W), black (S) and color components (C) are listed. The color entered on the extreme right is then given by the parameters S=10, W=10 and C=80. (The three numbers add up to 100, of course.)

In the NCS color wheel, each quarter of the circle between any two primary colors is divided by a scale that indicates the percentage of each color according to the following scheme: Y40R means yellow with 40% red, and B20G means blue with 20% green. The assignment is based on the principle of similarity. This concept states that each color is similar to at most two of the elementary chromatic colors (besides white and black) where the correspondence can be estimated quantitatively with an accuracy of 5% (without the help of a physical standard). Such estimates should be able to be made even by observers who have little experience in dealing with color.

The variables of the NCS system are also defined by similarity. One of them is the hue that comes about as explained above. For example, the color orange should have 30% similarity to red and 70% similarity to yellow, which gives you the coordinates Y30R.

The chromaticity (proportion of a chromatic color) C and the proportion of black S come into play as further variables, as shown in the triangle. This means that the same chromatic components contain all colors that lie on the vertical lines — parallel to the black-white axis. Correspondingly, equal proportions of black contain all the colors in the series that run parallel to the line between white and the color under consideration. And all colors that lie on rows parallel to the line between black and the color contain the same amount of white (which does not have to be listed separately because it results from C and S or from the intersection of the corresponding rows).

The system of natural colors succeeds in taking over the good sides of the systems of Munsell and Ostwald without having to carry their disadvantages by limiting itself to the describability of a color perception. Its creators demonstrated empirically that any perceived surface color can be described by quantifying its similarity to at most four of the six elementary color sensations. In doing so, they strictly followed a phenomenological approach.

Natürlich ist auch das natürliche System der Farben nicht vollkommen, und seine Ausweitung auf Leuchtfarben zum Beispiel wird auch neue Kenntnisse über Sehen und Wahrnehmen mit sich bringen. Die offene Vielfalt der Farben übersteigt jedes geschlossene System, auch wenn es noch so raffiniert und rücksichtsvoll konstruiert ist.

CIE L*A*B* system 
Unfortunately, in the famous CIE diagram used by colorimetricians, it is not possible to simply determine color differences as distances in the diagram. Critics of the CIE diagram have always pointed out this disadvantage, manifested by the over-representation of green and the corners of red, violet and blue tones being squeezed together. The CIEL*a*b* system emerges from the CIE color diagram by converting the original three coordinates X, Y and Z into three new parameters L, A and B. The aim of this transformation is a color space that should help to determine color differences numerically.

Industrial color applications are not just about measuring colors. What is particularly important is the possibility of being able to precisely determine color differences. The reason for this is simply that when a customer orders a producer to supply a desired object (e.g. a car) in the desired color (e.g. Ice Green), he expects the ordered item to be a color that matches a second (already existing) colour, with a small tolerance, of course.

Unfortunately, in the famous CIE diagram used by colorimetricians, it is not possible to simply determine color differences as distances in the diagram. Critics of the CIE diagram have always pointed out this disadvantage, manifested by the over-representation of green and the corners of red, violet and blue tones being squeezed together.

Since the 1960s, easily practicable formulas for calculating differences have been proposed in the literature on the subject of color differences, which are then more or less widely used. In 1976, a new metric recommended by the CIE appeared under the abbreviation CIELAB or CIEL*a*b*, which was then used extensively for non-luminous objects, such as textiles, paints and plastic objects. The CIEL*a*b* system seems to cover the mentioned industrial needs. The metric presented at the same time with the abbreviation CIELUV or CIEL*u*v*, on the other hand, helps to capture color differences, for example in flashes, in photography or on the television picture.

In order to arrive at the CIEL*a*b* color space, the three colorimetric coordinates (color values) X, Y and Z of the CIE standard color table are converted into three new sizes, which are designated L, a and b. X and Y become a in a not very simple way, Y and Z create b in a similar way, and Y alone provides the way to L (which results in the values entered in the left cube, which are not explained in more detail here). L ("lightness") provides something like a "psychometric lightness" (or "lightness"), that is, this parameter is defined by the appropriate function of a psychophysical quantity (a color value) chosen such that equal scale intervals so reproduce as closely as possible the same differences between colors that are related in lightness. The values of L range from 0 for black (nero) to 100 for white (bianco).

The resulting CIEL*a*b* diagram is sometimes called a "psychometric color diagram", where the colors are perpendicular to each other along two directions. The plane spanned by them is itself perpendicular to the achromatic axis. The resulting "uniform color space" is of course based on the four psychological basic colors red (Rosso), green (Verde), blue (Blu) and yellow (Giallo), which Ewald Hering in his opponent theory as first described and which we now know are reported directly to the brain.

Opponent process 

The opponent process was proposed by Ewald Hering in which he described the four "simple" or "primary" colors (einfache or grundfarben) as red, green, yellow and blue. To Hering, colors appeared either as these pure colors or as "psychological mixes" of two of them. Furthermore, these colors were organized in "opponent" pairs, red vs. green and yellow vs. blue so that mixing could occur across pairs (e.g., a yellowish green or a yellowish red) but not within a pair (i.e., greenish red cannot be imagined).  An achromatic opponent process along black and white is also part of Hering's explanation of color perception. Hering asserted that we did not know why these color relationships were true but knew that they were. Red, green, yellow, and blue (sometimes with white and black) are known as the psychological primaries. Although there is a great deal of evidence for the opponent process in the form of neural mechanisms, there is currently no clear mapping of the psychological primaries to neural substrates.

The psychological primaries were applied by Richard S. Hunter as the primaries for Hunter L,a,b colorspace that led to the creation of CIELAB. The Natural Color System is also directly inspired by the psychological primaries.

Hering's opponent process theory

The concept of certain hues as 'unique' came with the advent of Opponent process theory. Ewald Hering first proposed the idea that red, green, blue, and yellow were unique in 1892. His theory suggests that color vision is based on two opposing axes of color: a red-green axis and a blue-yellow axis. This theory is based strongly on the existence of perceptually impossible colors or color hue mixtures that have no meaning such as redgreen or yellowblue. These colors are perceptually impossible and suggest an opponent relationship between red and green, and blue and yellow. 

While this theory was initially considered contradictory to Young and Helmholtz’s trichromatic theory, the discovery of color-opponent cells in the retina and lateral geniculate nucleus (LGN) reconciled the two theories. It became widely accepted that the three cone types were recombined into three cone contrast pathways, two encoding color, and one encoding luminance, thereby reducing the redundancy of correlated cone signals. The axes proposed for these recombinations are commonly taken to be L+M, S-(L+M), and L-M.  and that all other hues are perceived as mixtures of these four hues.

Unique hues

The colors that define the extremes for each opponent channel are called unique hues, as opposed to composite (mixed) hues. Ewald Hering first defined the unique hues as red, green, blue, and yellow, and based them on the concept that these colors could not be simultaneously perceived. For example, a color cannot appear both red and green. These definitions have been experimentally refined and are represented today by average hue angles of 353° (carmine-red), 128° (cobalt green), 228° (cobalt blue), 58° (yellow).

Unique hues can differ between individuals and are often used in psychophysical research to measure variations in color perception due to color-vision deficiencies or color adaptation. While there is considerable inter-subject variability when defining unique hues experimentally, an individual's unique hues are very consistent, to within a few nanometers.

what are the 4 pure colors 
According to the dominant Hering opponent color framework, the hues red, green, blue, and yellow are distinctive and fundamental to all hue perception, in part due to the fact that they admit of pure or unique variants and all other hues (such as orange) appear as mixtures of them.

Models

Old Traditional Model with Four Primary Colors (RYBG) 
the ancient painters used red, yellow, blue and green as psychological primary colors. it was RYBG model since Leonardo da Vinci removed the green color now it is considered RYB model.

New model in light technology (RGBY) 

technology brought out a new yellow Subpixel to give more color (RGBY) instead of RGB.

How Many Psychological Primary Colors Are 4 Or 6? 
Psychologist Angela Wright states that there are 4 primary psychological colors which are red, yellow, green and blue.

Ewald Hering Affirms that there are 6 Primary Psychological Colors Grouping them In Pairs White-Black, Red-Green, Blue-Yellow.

Wheel Of The Four Primary Psychological Colors 
The 4 Primary Color Wheel Is A Color Wheel With Four Primary Colors. This is not a color mixing wheel,  but they can combine.

Primary colors 
There are 4 psychological primary colors, which are red, yellow, blue and green.

Secondary colours 
There are 4 secondary colors, which are orange, magenta/purple, cyan/blue-green and yellow-green.

Tertiary colors 
There are 8 tertiary colors, which are warm red (red-orange), warm yellow (amber), cool yellow, warm green, cool green (cyan-green/spring green), cool blue (azure/cyan-blue), warm blue (violet) and cool red (rose).

Mixing Primary Colors With Other Primary Colors 
There are 4 different mixes. 
 Red + Blue = Magenta/purple.
 Yellow + Green = Yellow-Green.
 Red + Yellow = Orange.
 Green + Blue = Cyan/blue-green.
There are two mixtures of colors that are not found on the wheel of the four primary colors, which are, red + green, and blue + yellow. Since green is the complementary of red, and blue is the complementary of yellow, mixing red + green = olive (dark yellow), and blue + yellow = greyish green. Complementary colors cancel each other, mixing them will result in a dull and dirty color.

Mixing Primary Colors With Secondary Colors 
There are 8 Different Mixes.  

 Red + Orange = Warm Red.

 Red + Magenta/Purple = Cool Red.

 Yellow + Orange = Warm Yellow.

 Yellow + Yellow-Green = Cool Yellow.

 Green + Yellow-Green = Warm Green.

 Green + Cyan/Blue-Green = Cool Green.

 Blue + Cyan/Blue-Green = Cool Blue.

 Blue + Magenta/Purple = Warm Blue.

Complementary (Opposite) Colors 
Complementary colors are those that are seen opposite each other on the color wheel, forming a line.

They are 8 Different Pairs. 

 Red is the complementary of green.
 Blue is the complementary of yellow.
 Orange is the complementary of cyan/blue-green.
 Magenta/purple is the complementary of yellow-green.
 Warm yellow is the complementary of cool blue.
 Warm blue is the complementary of cool yellow.
 Warm red is the complementary of cool green.
 Warm green is the complementary of cool red.

Representation of the four primary colors in the four elements 

Sometimes they use ocher instead of yellow. Earth, Fire, Water, and Sky. In this way, the first categorization of colors was born, beyond black and white, although this category would be far from being the definitive one. Let's see what happened a few centuries later.

White, as an absolute color, green for water, blue for sky, red for fire, yellow for earth and black for darkness. 

There are other occasions that are Earth (Yellow), Fire (Red), Water (Green) and Air (Blue) replacing the sky that is also used blue.

History

Philosophy 
Philosophical writing from ancient Greece has described notions of primary colors but they can be difficult to interpret in terms of modern color science. Theophrastus (ca. 371–287 BCE) described Democritus’ position that the primary colors were white, black, red, and green. In Classical Greece, Empedocles identified white, black, red, and, (depending on the interpretation) either yellow or green as primary colors. Aristotle described a notion in which white and black could be mixed in different ratios to yield chromatic colors;  this idea had considerable influence in Western thinking about color. François d'Aguilon's notion of the five primary colors (white, yellow, red, blue, black) was influenced by Aristotle's idea of the chromatic colors being made of black and white.The 20th century philosopher Ludwig Wittgenstein explored color-related ideas using red, green, blue, and yellow as primary colors.

References

External links 

Colors